Joe Fagin (born January 1940) is a British pop singer-songwriter. He is best known for the 1984 chart hit "Breakin' Away / That's Livin' Alright", and for singing a version of "As Time Goes By" for the 1990s BBC comedy series of the same name starring Judi Dench and Geoffrey Palmer.

Biography
Fagin was musical director for Jim Davidson, including his 1983 Falklands tour.  "Breakin' Away" / "That's Livin' Alright", the opening and closing theme songs to the first series of the comedy-drama Auf Wiedersehen, Pet, which as a double A-side reached number 3 in the UK Singles Chart in January 1984.

In 1982, he had his only U.S. Billboard Hot 100 charting single, "Younger Days". It peaked as high as No. 80 on the Billboard Hot 100, and was released as a single in the States on Millennium Records.

In 1985 he was part of The Crowd, which reached number one with the charity single "You'll Never Walk Alone" for the Bradford City stadium fire.

"Get it Right" and "Back With the Boys Again", the two songs for the second series of Auf Wiedersehen, Pet, were also released as a single, reaching number 53 in 1986.

He also sang the version of "As Time Goes By" used as the theme of the sitcom of the same name.

Fagin released a greatest hits album in 1996, which included a cover of the Beatles song "She's Leaving Home".

"Breakin' Away" / "That's Livin' Alright" was re-released when Auf Wiedersehen, Pet was repeated on Channel 4 in 1996.

A reworked version of "That's Living Alright" was released on 5 June 2006 for the World Cup. However, "That's England Alright" was an unofficial song, since Embrace were chosen to record the official song, "World at Your Feet".

References

External links

1940 births
Living people
English male singer-songwriters